Francisco Solé (born 2 May 1997) is an Argentine professional footballer who plays as a midfielder for Defensores on loan from Barracas Central.

Club career
Solé spent time at the youth club J.J. Batista. He joined Argentinos Juniors in 2010, turning down a move to San Lorenzo in the process. In August 2017, Solé completed a loan move to Brown of Primera B Nacional. He made his Brown and professional debut on 28 October in a defeat to Guillermo Brown, after appearing on the substitutes bench in an early October game versus Juventud Unida. In July 2019, Solé departed Argentinos Juniors to join Sportivo Italiano in Primera C Metropolitana. One goal in twenty-two appearances followed. In July 2020, Primera B Nacional's Barracas Central signed Solé.

International career
Solé received an Argentina U20 call-up for the 2016 COTIF Tournament. He featured once, in a Group B win against Costa Rica.

Career statistics
.

References

External links

1997 births
Living people
Footballers from Buenos Aires
Argentine footballers
Argentina youth international footballers
Argentina under-20 international footballers
Association football midfielders
Primera Nacional players
Primera C Metropolitana players
Argentinos Juniors footballers
Club Atlético Brown footballers
Sportivo Italiano footballers
Barracas Central players
Flandria footballers
Defensores de Belgrano footballers